Joseph Francis Menna (born March 1970) is an American sculptor and engraver who has worked in both digital and traditional sculpture media. He has been the Chief Engraver of the United States Mint since February, 2019.

Biography
Menna trained formally at the University of the Arts in Philadelphia, Pennsylvania, New York Academy Graduate School of Figurative Art in New York City, New York and Saint Petersburg Art and Industry Academy in St. Petersburg, Russia.  Menna sculpted the reverse  of the 2010 Lincoln Cent.  He also supplemented his training with studies at Arts Students League, and the Sculpture Center in Manhattan, New York.

Menna was raised in the Blackwood section of Gloucester Township, New Jersey. After graduating from Highland Regional High School he attended the University of the Arts in Philadelphia from which he graduated in 1992. He was awarded a master's degree in 1994 from the New York Academy of Art.

As a professional fine art sculptor, Menna's clients include the United States Mint, DC Comics, Fisher-Price and Hasbro, among others.

In 2005, Menna joined the United States Mint as a medallic sculptor.  He sculpted the design of United States Mint Artistic Infusion Program Associate Designer Lyndall Bass into the 2010 Lincoln Cent and his initials, JFM, appear on the reverse of the coin under the right side of the scroll.

His sculpting work can also be seen on the 2014 Everglades National Park quarter.

Menna  has also done the Digital concept sculpture for the Statue of Unity, situated in Gujarat, India. It is currently the tallest statue in the world at 597 feet.

In February 2019, Menna became the 14th Chief Engraver of the United States Mint. The position had been vacant since 2010.

A resident of Bordentown, New Jersey, Menna and his wife have three children.

Awards and honors
Along with the 2010 Lincoln Cent, Menna is also credited with designing or sculpting:
 2007 First Spouse Martha Washington obverse (design and sculpt)
 2007 First Spouse Abigail Adams obverse (design and sculpt)
 2007 Utah State Quarter reverse (design and sculpt)
 2007 Presidential $1 George Washington obverse (design and sculpt)
 2007 Presidential $1 Thomas Jefferson obverse (design and sculpt)
 2007 Presidential $1 William Henry Harrison obverse (design and sculpt)
 2006 San Francisco Mint Gold obverse (sculpt)

References

External links
Joseph Menna at Artstation
Action Figure Insider's interview with Joseph Menna
Joseph Menna's digital sculptures

20th-century American sculptors
Living people
New York Academy of Art alumni
People from Bordentown, New Jersey
People from Gloucester Township, New Jersey
University of the Arts (Philadelphia) alumni
United States Mint engravers
21st-century American sculptors
1970 births